Diane Farr (born September 7, 1969) is an American actress, producer, and writer. She is known for her roles as the FBI agent Megan Reeves in the CBS television series Numb3rs and the firefighter Laura Miles in Rescue Me.

Life and career
Diane Farr was born on September 7, 1969, in New York City. She is of Irish and Italian descent. Farr studied drama at New York's Stony Brook University and Loughborough University in England and graduated with a joint bachelor of arts from these two universities.

Farr has written two books. The first, The Girl Code, was published in 2001 and has been translated into seven languages. It discusses the secret language of single women. Her second book, Kissing Outside the Lines, was published in May 2011 and is a comical memoir of her path to an interracial marriage. Farr also writes for a number of American magazines and has an internationally syndicated newspaper column for the International Herald Tribune.

Farr was a co-host for 200 episodes of the advice program Loveline on MTV and made guest appearances on The Drew Carey Show, Arli$$, and CSI. She portrayed the recurring role of Amy DeLuca, mother to the series co-star Majandra Delfino's character Maria, on The WB's and later UPN's Roswell. She also played Maddie Hudson on The WB's Like Family. Later, she played Detective Jan Fendrich on the ABC series The Job, co-created by and starring Denis Leary. Following the end of that series, she appeared in the cast of Rescue Me (also co-created by and starring Leary), playing a firefighter for two seasons. She left Rescue Me to star as FBI agent Megan Reeves on the CBS crime drama Numb3rs.

Farr opted not to renew her contract and left Numb3rs following the show’s fourth season. She starred in her final episode on May 18, 2008.  Farr then joined  the Showtime series Californication for a 10-episode run in autumn 2009.

In April 2010, Farr had a role as Barbara, a mother whose negative influence led her son Eddie to become a serial killer, in a flashback episode of Desperate Housewives. When Barbara discovered Eddie's collection of newspaper articles about the women he hurt or murdered, he strangled her to death. She guest-starred in White Collar as a waitress named Gina De Stefano.

Farr guest-starred in season seven of Grey's Anatomy, where in episode 130, she played the role of a patient with Huntington's disease under the care of Meredith, played by the series star Ellen Pompeo. She also had a recurring role in the final season (2012–13) of the Grey's Anatomy spin-off series, Private Practice, as Miranda, a terminal cancer patient and the love interest of Dr. Sheldon Wallace (Brian Benben).

For several years starting in 2010, Farr wrote, directed and presented a reality comedy series for FunnyorDie.com called AssCastles.

In Adam Carolla's 2015 film Road Hard, Farr starred as his character's love interest.

Currently, Farr stars as Sharon Leone, Cal Fire Division Chief and mother of lead character Bode Donovan, in Jerry Bruckheimer's 2022 American drama television series, Fire Country.

Personal life
On June 26, 2006, she married the 36-year-old entertainment marketing executive Seung Yong Chung. Their first child, son Beckett Mancuso Chung, was born in March 2007 and they had twin daughters in August 2008.
Farr has also written a book on interracial romance, Kissing Outside the Lines.

Filmography

Film

Television

References

External links
 

1969 births
20th-century American actresses
21st-century American actresses
Actresses from New York City
Alumni of Loughborough University
American atheists
American film actresses
American people of Irish descent
American television actresses
American women writers
American writers of Italian descent
Former Roman Catholics
Living people
People from La Cañada Flintridge, California
Writers from Manhattan
Stony Brook University alumni